"Still Dreaming" may refer to:

"Still Dreaming", song by Nas featuring Chrisette Michele, from Hip Hop Is Dead
"Still Dreaming", song by 311, from Evolver
"Still Dreaming", song by Silverstein, from Arrivals & Departures
Still Dreaming (album) (2018), by Joshua Redman
Still Dreaming (TXT album) (2021), by Tomorrow X Together